

Events

Pre-1600
3761 BC – The epoch reference date (start) of the modern Hebrew calendar.
1403 – Venetian–Genoese wars: The Genoese fleet under a French admiral is defeated by a Venetian fleet at the Battle of Modon.
1477 – Uppsala University is inaugurated after receiving its corporate rights from Pope Sixtus IV in February the same year.
1513 – War of the League of Cambrai: Spain defeats Venice.
1571 – The Battle of Lepanto is fought, and the Ottoman Navy suffers its first defeat.

1601–1900
1691 – The charter for the Province of Massachusetts Bay is issued.
1763 – King George III issues the Royal Proclamation of 1763, closing Indigenous lands in North America north and west of the Alleghenies to white settlements.
1777 – American Revolutionary War: The Americans defeat British forces under general John Burgoyne in the Second Battle of Saratoga, also known as the Battle of Bemis Heights, compelling Burgoyne's eventual surrender.
1780 – American Revolutionary War: American militia defeat royalist irregulars led by British major Patrick Ferguson at the Battle of Kings Mountain in South Carolina, often regarded as the turning point in the war's Southern theater.
1800 – French corsair Robert Surcouf, commander of the 18-gun ship La Confiance, captures the British 38-gun Kent.
1826 – The Granite Railway begins operations as the first chartered railway in the U.S.
1828 – Morea expedition: The city of Patras, Greece, is liberated by the French expeditionary force.
1840 – Willem II becomes King of the Netherlands.
1864 – American Civil War: A US Navy ship captures a Confederate raider in a Brazilian seaport.
1868 – Cornell University holds opening day ceremonies; initial student enrollment is 412, the highest at any American university to that date.
1870 – Franco-Prussian War: Léon Gambetta escapes the siege of Paris in a hot-air balloon.
1879 – Germany and Austria-Hungary sign the "Twofold Covenant" and create the Dual Alliance.

1901–present
1912 – The Helsinki Stock Exchange sees its first transaction.
1913 – Ford Motor Company introduces the first moving vehicle assembly line.
1916 – Georgia Tech defeats Cumberland University 222–0 in the most lopsided college football game in American history.
1919 – KLM, the flag carrier of the Netherlands, is founded. It is the oldest airline still operating under its original name.
1924 – Andreas Michalakopoulos becomes prime minister of Greece for a short period of time.
1929 – Photius II becomes Ecumenical Patriarch of Constantinople.
1933 – Air France is inaugurated, after being formed by a merger of five French airlines.
1940 – World War II: The McCollum memo proposes bringing the United States into the war in Europe by provoking the Japanese to attack the United States.
1944 – World War II: During an uprising at Birkenau concentration camp, Jewish prisoners burn down Crematorium IV.
1949 – The communist German Democratic Republic (East Germany) is formed.
1950 – Mother Teresa establishes the Missionaries of Charity.
1958 – The 1958 Pakistani coup d'état inaugurates a prolonged period of military rule.
  1958   – The U.S. manned space-flight project is renamed to Project Mercury.
1959 – The Soviet probe Luna 3 transmits the first-ever photographs of the far side of the Moon.
1961 – A Douglas Dakota IV operated by Derby Aviation (later renamed to British Midland International) crashes in Canigou, France, killing 34 people.
1963 – President Kennedy signs the ratification of the Partial Nuclear Test Ban Treaty.
1963 – Buddhist crisis: Amid worsening relations, outspoken South Vietnamese First Lady Madame Ngo Dinh Nhu arrives in the US for a speaking tour, continuing a flurry of attacks on the Kennedy administration.
1977 – The Fourth Soviet Constitution is adopted.
1985 – The Mameyes landslide kills almost 200 people in Puerto Rico.
1987 – Sikh nationalists declare the independence of Khalistan from India; it is not internationally recognized.
  1987   – Fiji becomes a republic.
1988 – A hunter discovers three gray whales trapped under the ice near Alaska; the situation becomes a multinational effort to free the whales.
1991 – Croatian War of Independence: Bombing of Banski dvori in Zagreb, Croatia.
1993 – The flood of '93 ends at St. Louis, Missouri, 103 days after it began, as the Mississippi River falls below flood stage.
1996 – Fox News Channel begins broadcasting.
1998 – Matthew Shepard, a gay student at the University of Wyoming, is found tied to a fence after being savagely beaten by two young adults in Laramie, Wyoming. He dies five days later.
2000 – Israeli-Palestinian conflict: Hezbollah militants capture three Israeli Defense Force soldiers in a cross-border raid.
2001 – The U.S. invasion of Afghanistan begins with an air assault and covert operations on the ground, starting the longest war in American history.
2002 – The Space Shuttle Atlantis launches on STS-112 to continue assembly of the International Space Station.
2008 – Asteroid 2008 TC3 impacts the Earth over Sudan, the first time an asteroid impact is detected prior to its entry into earth's atmosphere.
  2008   – Qantas Flight 72 experiences an in-flight upset near Learmonth, Victoria, Australia, injuring 112.
2016 – In the wake of Hurricane Matthew, the death toll rises to over 800.
2022 – 10 people die and 8 are injured in an explosion at petrol station in Creeslough.
2022 – Ales Bialiatski, along with two organisations; Memorial & Center for Civil Liberties are awarded the Nobel Peace Prize.

Births

Pre-1600
14 BC – Drusus Julius Caesar, Roman politician (d. 23 AD)
1301 – Grand Prince Aleksandr Mikhailovich of Tver (d. 1339)
1409 – Elizabeth of Luxembourg (d. 1442)
1471 – Frederick I of Denmark (d. 1533)
1474 – Bernhard III, Margrave of Baden-Baden (d. 1536)
1482 – Ernest, Margrave of Baden-Durlach (d. 1553)
1573 – William Laud, English archbishop and academic (d. 1645)
1576 – John Marston, English poet and playwright (d. 1634)
1586 – Isaac Massa, Dutch diplomat (d. 1643)
1589 – Archduchess Maria Maddalena of Austria (d. 1631)
1591 – Pierre Le Muet, French architect (d. 1669)
1597 – Captain John Underhill, English settler and soldier (d. 1672)

1601–1900
1635 – Roger de Piles, French painter (d. 1709)
1713 – Granville Elliott, English general (d. 1759)
1728 – Caesar Rodney, American soldier, lawyer, and politician, 4th Governor of Delaware (d. 1784)
1744 – Sergey Vyazmitinov, Russian general and politician, War Governor of Saint Petersburg (d. 1819)
1746 – William Billings, American composer and educator (d. 1800)
1748 – Charles XIII of Sweden (d. 1818)
1769 – Solomon Sibley, American lawyer, jurist, and politician, 1st Mayor of Detroit (d. 1846)
1786 – Louis-Joseph Papineau, Canadian lawyer and politician (d. 1871)
1798 – Jean-Baptiste Vuillaume, French instrument maker and businessman (d. 1875)
1819 – Ann Eliza Smith, American author and patriot (d. 1905)
1821 – Richard H. Anderson, American general (d. 1879)
1832 – Charles Crozat Converse, American lawyer and composer (d. 1918)
1835 – Felix Draeseke, German composer and educator (d. 1913)
1836 – Henri Elzéar Taschereau, Canadian scholar and jurist, 4th Chief Justice of Canada (d. 1911)
1841 – Nicholas I of Montenegro (d. 1921)
1849 – James Whitcomb Riley, American poet and author (d. 1916)
1860 – Leonidas Paraskevopoulos, Greek general and politician (d. 1936)
1866 – Wlodimir Ledóchowski, Polish-Austrian religious leader, 26th Superior General of the Society of Jesus (d. 1942)
1870 – Uncle Dave Macon, American old-time country banjo player, singer-songwriter, and comedian (d. 1952)
1876 – Louis Tancred, South African cricketer (d. 1934)
1879 – Joe Hill, Swedish-born American labor activist and poet (d. 1915)
1881 – Mikhail Drozdovsky, Ukrainian-Russian general (d. 1918)
1884 – Harold Geiger, American lieutenant and pilot (d. 1927)
1885 – Niels Bohr, Danish physicist and philosopher, Nobel Prize laureate (d. 1962)
  1885   – Claud Ashton Jones, American admiral, Medal of Honor recipient (d. 1948)
1887 – Jack Russell, English cricketer and coach (d. 1961)
1888 – Henry A. Wallace, American agronomist and politician, 33rd Vice President of the United States (d. 1965)
  1888   – Edna Meade Colson, American educator and activist (d. 1985)
1889 – Robert Z. Leonard, American actor, director, producer, and screenwriter (d. 1968)
1892 – Dwain Esper, American director and producer (d. 1982)
1893 – Alice Dalgliesh, Trinidadian-American author and publisher (d. 1979)
1895 – Maurice Grevisse, Belgian linguist and author (d. 1980) 
1896 – Paulino Alcántara, Spanish Filipino football player and manager (d. 1964)
1897 – Elijah Muhammad, American religious leader (d. 1975)
  1897   – Thakin Mya, Burmese lawyer and politician (d. 1947)
1900 – Heinrich Himmler, German commander and politician (d. 1945)

1901–present
1904 – Armando Castellazzi, Italian footballer and coach (d. 1968)
1905 – Andy Devine, American actor (d. 1977)
1907 – Helen MacInnes, Scottish-American librarian and author (d. 1985)
1909 – Anni Blomqvist, Finnish author (d. 1990)
  1909   – Shura Cherkassky, Ukrainian-American pianist and educator (d. 1995)
  1909   – Erastus Corning 2nd, American soldier and politician, 72nd Mayor of Albany (d. 1983)
1910 – Henry Plumer McIlhenny, American art collector and philanthropist (d. 1986)
1911 – Vaughn Monroe, American singer, trumpet player, and bandleader (d. 1973)
1912 – Fernando Belaúnde Terry, Peruvian architect and politician, 85th President of Peru (d. 2002)
  1912   – Peter Walker, English race car driver (d. 1984)
1913 – Simon Carmiggelt, Dutch journalist and author (d. 1987)
  1913   – Raimond Valgre, Estonian pianist, guitarist, and composer (d. 1949)
1914 – Begum Akhtar, Indian actress (d. 1974)
  1914   – Sarah Churchill, English actress (d. 1982)
  1914   – Alfred Drake, American actor and singer (d. 1992)
  1914   – Herman Keiser, American golfer (d. 2003)
1917 – June Allyson, American actress (d. 2006)
1918 – Harry V. Jaffa, American historian, philosopher, and academic (d. 2015)
1919 – Henriette Avram, American computer scientist and academic (d. 2006)
  1919   – Zelman Cowen, Australian academic and politician, 19th Governor-General of Australia (d. 2011)
  1919   – Georges Duby, French historian and author (d. 1996)
1920 – Georg Leber, German soldier and politician, German Federal Minister of Defence (d. 2012)
  1920   – Jack Rowley, English footballer and manager (d. 1998)
1921 – Raymond Goethals, Belgian footballer and coach (d. 2004)
1922 – Grady Hatton, American baseball player, coach, and manager (d. 2013)
  1922   – William Zinsser, American journalist and critic (d. 2015)
1923 – Irma Grese, German SS officer (d. 1945)
  1923   – Břetislav Pojar, Czech animator and director (d. 2012)
  1923   – Jean-Paul Riopelle, Canadian painter and sculptor (d. 2002)
1927 – Al Martino, American singer and actor (d. 2009) 
  1927   – R. D. Laing, Scottish psychiatrist and author (d. 1989)
  1927   – Demetrio González, Spanish-Mexican film actor and singer (d. 2015)
1928 – José Messias, Brazilian composer, singer, writer, host and critic (d. 2015)
  1928   – Ali Kafi, Pakistani politician (d. 2013)
  1928   – Lorna Wing, English autism researcher (d. 2014)
1929 – Graeme Ferguson, Canadian director and producer, co-founded the IMAX Corporation (d. 2021)
  1929   – Mariano Gagnon, American Catholic priest and author (d. 2017)
  1929   – Robert Westall, English journalist and author (d. 1993)
1930 – Curtis Crider, American race car driver (d. 2012)
1931 – Cotton Fitzsimmons, American basketball player and coach (d. 2004)
  1931   – Tommy Lewis, American football player and coach (d. 2014)
  1931   – R. Sivagurunathan, Sri Lankan journalist, lawyer, and academic (d. 2003)
  1931   – Desmond Tutu, South African archbishop and activist, Nobel Prize laureate (d. 2021)
1932 – Joannes Gijsen, Dutch bishop (d. 2013)
1933 – Harold Dunaway, American race car driver and pilot (d. 2012)
1934 – Amiri Baraka, American poet, playwright, and academic (d. 2014)
  1934   – Ulrike Meinhof, German far-left terrorist, co-founder of the Red Army Faction, journalist (d. 1976)
  1934   – Julian Thompson, English general and historian
1935 – Thomas Keneally, Australian novelist, playwright, and essayist
1936 – Michael Hurll, English director, producer, and screenwriter (d. 2012)
1937 – Christopher Booker, English journalist and author (d. 2019)
  1937   – Chet Powers, American singer-songwriter and guitarist (d. 1994)
  1937   – Maria Szyszkowska, Polish academic and politician
1938 – Yvonne Brewster, Jamaican actress and theatre director
  1938   – Ann Jones, English tennis player and sportscaster
1939 – John Hopcroft, American computer scientist and author
  1939   – Clive James, Australian television host, author, and critic (d. 2019)
  1939   – Harry Kroto, English chemist and academic, Nobel Prize laureate (d. 2016)
  1939   – Laurent Monsengwo Pasinya, Congolese cardinal (d. 2021)
  1939   – Bill Snyder, American football player and coach
1942 – Joy Behar, American talk show host, comedian and television personality 
1943 – José Cardenal, Cuban baseball player and coach
  1943   – Oliver North, American colonel, journalist, and author
1944 – Judee Sill, American singer-songwriter and musician (d. 1979)
  1944   – Donald Tsang, Chinese civil servant and politician, 2nd Chief Executive of Hong Kong
1945 – Kevin Godley, English singer-songwriter and director 
  1945   – David Wallace, Scottish physicist and academic
1946 – John Brass, Australian rugby player and coach
  1946   – Catharine MacKinnon, American lawyer, activist, and author
1947 – Chris Bambridge, Australian footballer and referee
1948 – Diane Ackerman, American poet and essayist
  1948   – John F. B. Mitchell, English climatologist and author
  1948   – Stephen Rucker, American composer
1949 – Dave Hope, American bass player and priest 
1950 – Dick Jauron, American football player and coach
  1950   – Jakaya Kikwete, Tanzanian colonel, economist, and politician, 4th President of Tanzania
1951 – Enki Bilal, French comic book creator, comics artist and film director
  1951   – John Mellencamp, American singer-songwriter, guitarist, and actor
1952 – Vladimir Putin, Russian colonel and politician, 4th President of Russia
  1952   – Jacques Richard, Canadian ice hockey player (d. 2002)
  1952   – Graham Yallop, Australian cricketer
1953 – Linda Griffiths, Canadian actress and playwright (d. 2014)
  1953   – Margus Lepa, Estonian journalist and actor
  1953   – Tico Torres, American drummer 
1955 – Ralph Johnson, American computer scientist and author
  1955   – Bill Henson, Australian photographer
  1955   – Yo-Yo Ma, French-American cellist and educator 
1956 – Steve Bainbridge, English rugby player
  1956   – Mike Shipley, Australian-English sound engineer and producer (d. 2013)
  1956   – Brian Sutter, Canadian ice hockey player and coach
1957 – Joey Marquez, Filipino basketball player, actor, and politician
  1957   – Michael W. Smith, American singer-songwriter and actor
  1957   – Jayne Torvill, English figure skater
1959 – Dylan Baker, American actor
  1959   – Simon Cowell, English businessman and producer
  1959   – Lourdes Flores, Peruvian lawyer and politician
  1959   – Jean-Marc Fournier, Canadian lawyer and politician
  1959   – Brazo de Oro, Mexican wrestler (d. 2017)
1960 – Kevin Boyle, American historian and author
1961 – Brian Mannix, Australian singer-songwriter
  1961   – Tony Sparano, American football player and coach (d. 2018)
1962 – Dave Bronconnier, Canadian businessman and politician, 35th Mayor of Calgary
  1962   – Micky Flanagan, English comedian
  1962   – William Johnson, German-English cricketer
1964 – Sam Brown, English singer-songwriter, musician, and record producer
  1964   – Dan Savage, American LGBT rights activist, journalist and television producer
  1964   – Paul Stewart, English footballer
1965 – Genji Hashimoto, Japanese race car driver
  1965   – Kumiko Watanabe, Japanese voice actress
1966 – Sherman Alexie,  American novelist, short story writer, poet, and filmmaker
  1966   – Marco Beltrami, Italian-American composer and conductor
  1966   – Janet Shaw, Australian cyclist and author (d. 2012)
1967 – Michelle Alexander, American law professor, author and activist 
  1967   – Peter Baker, English golfer
  1967   – Toni Braxton, American singer-songwriter, producer, and actress 
1968 – Thom Yorke, English singer-songwriter and guitarist 
1969 – Bobbie Brown, American model and actress
  1969   – Malia Hosaka, American wrestler
1971 – Daniel Boucher, Canadian singer and actor
1972 – Marlou Aquino, Filipino basketball player
  1972   – Ben Younger, American director, producer, and screenwriter
1973 – Dida, Brazilian footballer
  1973   – Priest Holmes, American football player
  1973   – Sami Hyypiä, Finnish footballer and manager
  1973   – Grigol Mgaloblishvili, Georgian politician and diplomat, 7th Prime Minister of Georgia
1974 – Rune Glifberg, Danish skateboarder
  1974   – Ruslan Nigmatullin, Russian footballer
  1974   – Charlotte Perrelli, Swedish singer 
1975 – Giorgos Karadimos, Greek singer-songwriter and guitarist
  1975   – Damian Kulash, American singer-songwriter and guitarist 
  1975   – Tim Minchin, English-Australian comedian, actor, and singer
1976 – Marc Coma, Spanish motorcycle racer
  1976   – Taylor Hicks, American singer-songwriter
  1976   – Gilberto Silva, Brazilian footballer
  1976   – Santiago Solari, Argentinian footballer and manager
  1976   – Charles Woodson, American football player
1977 – Antoine Revoy, French comics writer and illustrator
1978 – Alison Balsom, English trumpet player and educator
  1978   – Alesha Dixon, English singer-songwriter and dancer 
  1978   – Zaheer Khan, Indian cricketer
1979 – Simona Amânar, Romanian gymnast
  1979   – Aaron Ashmore, Canadian actor
  1979   – Shawn Ashmore, Canadian actor
1982 – Madjid Bougherra, Algerian footballer
  1982   – Jermain Defoe, English footballer
  1982   – Robby Ginepri, American tennis player
  1982   – Li Yundi, Chinese pianist
  1982   – Lockett Pundt, American singer-songwriter and guitarist 
1983 – Archie Bland, English journalist and author
  1983   – Dwayne Bravo, Trinidadian cricketer
  1983   – Flying Lotus, American rapper, DJ, and producer
  1983   – Scottie Upshall, Canadian ice hockey player
1984 – Salman Butt, Pakistani cricketer
  1984   – Toma Ikuta, Japanese actor and singer
  1984   – Simon Poulsen, Danish footballer
  1984   – Zachary Wyatt, American soldier and politician
1985 – Evan Longoria, American baseball player
1986 – Chase Daniel, American football player
  1986   – Lee Nguyen, American soccer player
  1986   – Gunnar Nielsen, Faroese footballer
  1986   – Bree Olson, American actress, model, and former porn actress 
  1986   – Amy Satterthwaite, New Zealand cricketer
1987 – Jeremy Brockie, New Zealand footballer
  1987   – Aiden English, American wrestler
  1987   – Sam Querrey, American tennis player
1988 – Diego da Silva Costa, Brazilian footballer
1989 – Trent Merrin, Australian rugby league player
1990 – Sebastián Coates, Uruguayan footballer
1991 – Nicole Jung, American singer
1991   – Lay Zhang, Chinese singer-songwriter and actor
1992 – Mookie Betts, American baseball player
1995 – Lyndon Dykes, Australian professional footballer
  1995   – Lloyd Jones, English professional footballer
  1995   – Bram van Vlerken, Dutch professional football player
  1995   – Mathias Dyngeland, Norwegian footballer
1996 – Lewis Capaldi, Scottish singer-songwriter
1996 – Choi Jeong, South Korean Go player
1998 – Trent Alexander-Arnold, English professional footballer

Deaths

Pre-1600
 336 – Mark, pope of the Catholic Church
 858 – Montoku, Japanese emperor (b. 826)
 929 – Charles the Simple, French king (b. 879)
 950 – Li, Chinese empress consort
 951 – Shi Zong, emperor of the Liao Dynasty (b. 919)
   951   – Xiao, Chinese Khitan empress dowager
   951   – Zhen, Chinese Khitan empress consort
 988 – Qian Chu, king of Wuyue (b. 929)
1242 – Juntoku, Japanese emperor (b. 1197)
1259 – Ezzelino III da Romano, Italian ruler
1363 – Eleanor de Bohun, English noblewoman (b. 1304)
1368 – Lionel of Antwerp, 1st Duke of Clarence, Belgian-English politician (b. 1338)
1461 – Jean Poton de Xaintrailles, follower of Joan of Arc (b. c. 1390)
1468 – Sigismondo Pandolfo Malatesta, Italian nobleman (b. 1417)
1553 – Cristóbal de Morales, Spanish composer (b. 1500)
1571 – Sufi Ali Pasha, Ottoman soldier and politician, Ottoman Governor of Egypt
  1571   – Dorothea of Saxe-Lauenburg, Danish queen consort of Christian III of Denmark (b. 1511)
1577 – George Gascoigne, English soldier, courtier, and poet (b. 1535)

1601–1900
1612 – Giovanni Battista Guarini, Italian poet, playwright, and diplomat (b. 1538)
1620 – Stanisław Żółkiewski, Polish-Lithuanian commander (b. 1547)
1637 – Victor Amadeus I, duke of Savoy (b. 1587)
1651 – Jacques Sirmond, French scholar (b. 1559)
1653 – Fausto Poli, Italian cardinal (b. 1581)
1708 – Guru Gobind Singh, Indian 10th Sikh guru (b. 1666)
1747 – Giulia Lama, Italian painter (b. 1681)
1772 – John Woolman, American preacher and abolitionist (b. 1720)
1787 – Henry Muhlenberg, German-American pastor and missionary (b. 1711)
1792 – George Mason, American lawyer and politician (b. 1725)
1793 – Wills Hill, 1st Marquess of Downshire, English politician, President of the Board of Trade (b. 1718)
1796 – Thomas Reid, Scottish mathematician and philosopher (b. 1710)
1849 – Edgar Allan Poe, American short story writer, poet, and critic (b. 1809)
1884 – Bernard Petitjean, French Roman Catholic missionary to Japan (b. 1829)
1894 – Oliver Wendell Holmes Sr., American physician, author, and poet (b. 1809)

1901–present
1903 – Rudolf Lipschitz, German mathematician and academic (b. 1832)
1904 – Isabella Bird, English historian and explorer (b. 1831)
1906 – Honoré Beaugrand, Canadian journalist and politician, 18th Mayor of Montreal (b. 1848) 
1911 – John Hughlings Jackson, English neurologist and physician (b. 1835)
1919 – Alfred Deakin, Australian lawyer and politician, 2nd Prime Minister of Australia (b. 1856)
1925 – Christy Mathewson, American baseball player and manager (b. 1880)
1926 – Emil Kraepelin, German psychologist and academic (b. 1856)
1933 – Alexander Peacock, Australian politician, 20th Premier of Victoria (b. 1861)
1939 – Harvey Williams Cushing, American neurosurgeon and academic (b. 1869)
1943 – Radclyffe Hall, English author and poet (b. 1880)
1944 – Helmut Lent, German colonel and pilot (b. 1918)
1950 – Willis Haviland Carrier, American engineer (b. 1876)
1951 – Anton Philips, Dutch businessman, co-founded Philips (b. 1874)
1956 – Clarence Birdseye, American businessman, founded Birds Eye (b. 1886)
1959 – Mario Lanza, American tenor and actor (b. 1921)
1966 – Grigoris Asikis, Greek singer-songwriter (b. 1890)
1967 – Norman Angell, English journalist and politician, Nobel Prize laureate (b. 1872)
1969 – Léon Scieur, Belgian cyclist (b. 1888)
1970 – Alphonse-Marie Parent, Canadian priest and academic (b. 1906)
1983 – George O. Abell, American astronomer, professor, science popularizer, and skeptic (b. 1927)
1985 – Cemal Reşit Rey, Turkish pianist, composer, and conductor (b. 1904)
1990 – Beatrice Hutton, Australian architect (b. 1893)
  1990   – Chiara Badano, Italian beatified (b.1971)
  1990   – Grim Natwick, American animator (b. 1890)
1991 – Harry W. Brown, American colonel and pilot (b. 1921)
  1991   – Leo Durocher, American baseball player and manager (b. 1905)
  1991   – Darren Millane, Australian footballer (b. 1965)
1992 – Allan Bloom, American philosopher and educator (b. 1930)
  1992   – Babu Karam Singh Bal, Indian businessman and politician (b.1927)
1993 – Cyril Cusack, South African-born Irish actor (b. 1910)
1994 – Niels Kaj Jerne, Danish-English physician and immunologist, Nobel Prize laureate (b. 1911)
1995 – Ivan Hutchinson, Australian film critic and author (b. 1928)
  1995   – Olga Taussky-Todd, Austrian-Czech-American mathematician, attendant of the Vienna Circle (b. 1906)
1996 – Lou Lichtveld, Surinamese-Dutch author, playwright, and politician (b. 1903)
1998 – Cees de Vreugd, Dutch strongman and weightlifter (b. 1952)
2001 – Herblock, American cartoonist and author (b. 1909)
  2001   – Christopher Adams, English-American wrestler and trainer (b. 1955)
  2001   – Roger Gaudry, Canadian chemist and businessman (b. 1913)
2002 – Pierangelo Bertoli, Italian singer-songwriter and guitarist (b. 1942)
2003 – Izzy Asper, Canadian lawyer and politician (b. 1932)
  2003   – Arthur Berger, American composer and educator (b. 1912)
2004 – Tony Lanfranchi, English race car driver (b. 1935)
2005 – Charles Rocket, American actor and comedian (b. 1949)
2006 – Julen Goikoetxea, Spanish cyclist (b. 1985)
  2006   – Anna Politkovskaya, American-Russian journalist and activist (b. 1958)
2007 – Norifumi Abe, Japanese motorcycle racer (b. 1975)
  2007   – George E. Sangmeister, American lawyer and politician (b. 1931)
2009 – Irving Penn, American photographer (b. 1917)
2010 – T Lavitz, American keyboard player, composer, and producer (b. 1956)
  2010   – Milka Planinc, Croatian lawyer and politician, 7th Prime Minister of Yugoslavia (b. 1924)
2011 – Ramiz Alia, Albanian politician, 1st President of Albania (b. 1925)
  2011   – Andrew Laszlo, Hungarian-American cinematographer (b. 1926)
2012 – Mervyn M. Dymally, Trinidadian-American politician, 41st Lieutenant Governor of California (b. 1926)
  2012   – Ivo Michiels, Belgian-French author and poet (b. 1923)
  2012   – Wiley Reed, American-Australian singer-songwriter and pianist (b. 1944)
2013 – Mick Buckley, English footballer (b. 1953)
  2013   – Terry Burnham, American actress (b. 1949)
  2013   – Patrice Chéreau, French actor, director, producer, and screenwriter (b. 1944)
  2013   – David E. Jeremiah, American admiral (b. 1934)
  2013   – Leandro Mendoza, Filipino police officer and politician, 36th Executive Secretary of the Philippines (b. 1946)
  2013   – Joe Rogers, American lawyer and politician, 45th Lieutenant Governor of Colorado (b. 1964)
2014 – Nika Kiladze, Georgian footballer (b. 1988)
  2014   – Siegfried Lenz, Polish-German author and playwright (b. 1926)
  2014   – Iva Withers, Canadian-American actress and singer (b. 1917)
2015 – Harry Gallatin, American basketball player and coach (b. 1927)
  2015   – Hossein Hamadani, Iranian general (b. 1951)
  2015   – Jurelang Zedkaia, Marshallese politician, 5th President of the Marshall Islands (b. 1950)
2016 – Ross Higgins, Australian actor, comedian (b. 1930)
2020 – Mario Molina, Mexican chemist (b. 1943)
2022 – Arun Bali, Indian actor (b. 1942)

Holidays and observances
Christian feast day:
Justina of Padua
Henry Muhlenberg (some Lutheran Churches, Episcopal Church of the USA)
Osgyth
Our Lady of the Rosary
Pope Mark
Sergius and Bacchus
October 7 (Eastern Orthodox liturgics)
Teachers' Day (Laos)

References

External links

 
 
 

Days of the year
October